The Calogero Vinti Prize is awarded by the Italian Mathematical Union to an Italian mathematician not exceeding the age of 40, in recognition of his/her contributions to the field of Mathematical Analysis. The prize is entitled to the memory of the Italian mathematician Calogero Vinti and is awarded on the occasion of the Italian Mathematical Union conference every four years. 

Further prizes of the Italian Mathematical Union are the Caccioppoli Prize, the Bartolozzi Prize and the Stampacchia Medal.

Prize winners 
Source: Unione Matematica Italiana
1998 Riccardo De Arcangelis
2002 Susanna Terracini
2006 Stefano Bianchini
2010 Massimiliano Berti
2015 Ulisse Stefanelli
2019 Filippo Santambrogio

See also

 List of mathematics awards

References 

Awards of the Italian Mathematical Union
Awards established in 1998